Dame Agnes Lowndes Jekyll,  ( Graham; 12 October 1861 – 28 January 1937) was a Scottish-born British artist, writer and philanthropist. The daughter of William Graham, Liberal MP for Glasgow (1865–1874) and patron of the Pre-Raphaelite Brotherhood, she was educated at home by governesses, and later attended King's College London.

Family

Agnes Lowndes Graham married Herbert Jekyll (later Sir Herbert Jekyll, KCMG), a soldier, public servant and wood-carver, and brother of the noted garden designer, writer and artist, Gertrude Jekyll. They lived at Munstead House in Surrey.

Their children were: 
 Barbara Freyberg, Baroness Freyberg, GBE, DStJ (1887–1973); married first, in 1911, to the Hon. Francis McLaren, M.P. (killed 1917 in the Great War); secondly, in 1922, to Colonel B. C. Freyberg, V.C., later Lord Freyberg (1889–1963), and had issue by both husbands.
 Pamela Margaret (1889–1943); married 1908 the Right Hon. Reginald McKenna (died 1943), and had issue.
 Francis Walter Jekyll (1882-1965). He is commemorated on the Jekyll family memorial at Busbridge Church, Surrey, England.

Damehood
Agnes Jekyll was created a Dame Commander of the Order of the British Empire (DBE) in 1918 for her public works. She first published Kitchen Essays (1922) in The Times, reprinted in 2001 by Persephone Books.

References

External links
The Guardian reference; accessed 28 November 2014.

1861 births
1937 deaths
Alumni of King's College London
British philanthropists
British writers
Dames Commander of the Order of the British Empire
People from Godalming
Place of birth missing
Wives of knights